Chobanov (Bulgarian: Чобанов) is a Bulgarian masculine surname, its feminine counterpart is Chobanova. The surname may refer to the following notable people:
Mariana Chobanova (born 1965), Bulgarian basketball player
Petko Chobanov (born 1956), Bulgarian university administrator

Bulgarian-language surnames